Duncan Edward Cole (12 July 1958 – 21 May 2014) was a New Zealand association football player who represented New Zealand at the 1982 FIFA World Cup in Spain.

His senior career began with North Shore United before he moved to Australia to join Canberra City in the Australian National Soccer League

Cole made his full All Whites debut in a 2–0 win over Singapore on 1 October 1978. He was an integral member of the 1982 All Whites as they qualified for the 1982 FIFA World Cup in Spain, playing in all 15 qualifiers and all three group games in the finals tournament, where they lost to Scotland, USSR and Brazil.

Cole ended his international playing career with 58 A-international caps and 4 goals to his credit, his final cap in a 0–1 loss to Israel on 27 March 1988.

Death
He died in Auckland on 21 May 2014 at the age of 55.

References

External links

NZ 1982 World Cup Squad

1958 births
2014 deaths
English emigrants to New Zealand
New Zealand association footballers
New Zealand international footballers
1982 FIFA World Cup players
National Soccer League (Australia) players
New Zealand expatriate association footballers
Expatriate soccer players in Australia
New Zealand expatriate sportspeople in England
North Shore United AFC players
Canberra City FC players
Association football midfielders